Mynydd Meio is a 322-metre-high hill in the county borough of Caerphilly in South Wales. Parts of its western slopes fall within Rhondda Cynon Taf county borough. Its eastern slopes drop away to Cwm yr Aber between Caerphilly and Abertridwr and its western slopes to the valley of the Taf.

The hill is crossed by the Senghenydd Dyke, an ancient earthwork considered to date from the 13th century and associated with nearby Caerphilly Castle.

Geology 
The hill is formed from the Hughes Sandstone, within the Pennant Sandstone Formation, a sedimentary rock of late Carboniferous age (c 309-306 million years ago).

Access 
Much of the upper part of the hill is mapped as open access under the Countryside and Rights of Way Act 2000 and thereby generally available to walkers. It is also crossed by the Rhymney Valley Ridgeway Walk, a recreational path which in the immediate vicinity runs north from the hamlet of Groes-wen over the hill towards Cefn Eglwysilan.

References

External links 
 images of Mynydd Meio on Geograph website

Mountains and hills of Rhondda Cynon Taf
Mountains and hills of Caerphilly County Borough